The Cambridge Dodgers were a "Class D" Minor League Baseball team, based in Cambridge, Maryland that played in the Eastern Shore League from 1946 to 1949 as an affiliate of the Brooklyn Dodgers. Before World War II, they were an affiliate of the St. Louis Cardinals from 1937 to 1941 as the Cambridge Cardinals. A previous version of the team, the Cambridge Canners, played from 1922 to 1928.

Don Zimmer's first pro team were the 1949 Cambridge Dodgers; he remained in a baseball uniform until his death in 2014, most recently as a senior advisor to the Tampa Bay Rays. (Zimmer's teammate in Cambridge, Joe Pignatano, also played in the major leagues and was a coach for many years thereafter.)

Notable alumni
 Jake Flowers (1923)
 Danny Murtaugh (1937-1938) Manager: 1960 World Series Champion Pittsburgh Pirates
 Ken Raffensberger (1937) MLB All-Star
 George Selkirk (1927) 2 x MLB All-Star
 Max Surkont (1938)
 Don Zimmer (1949) 2 x MLB All-Star; 1989 NL Manager of the Year

External links
Baseball Reference
Remembrance of the Cambridge Dodgers

Defunct minor league baseball teams
Brooklyn Dodgers minor league affiliates
St. Louis Cardinals minor league affiliates
Professional baseball teams in Maryland
1922 establishments in Maryland
1949 disestablishments in Maryland
Defunct baseball teams in Maryland
Baseball teams established in 1922
Baseball teams disestablished in 1949
Defunct Eastern Shore League teams